Super Bowl VIII was an American football game between the National Football Conference (NFC) champion Minnesota Vikings and the American Football Conference (AFC) champion Miami Dolphins to decide the National Football League (NFL) champion for the 1973 season. The Dolphins conquered the Vikings by the score of 24–7 to win their second consecutive Super Bowl, the first team to do so since the Green Bay Packers in Super Bowls I and II, and the first AFL/AFC team to do so.

The game was played on January 13, 1974 at Rice Stadium in Houston, Texas. This was the first time the Super Bowl venue was not home to that of an NFL franchise. At the time, the Astrodome seated just over 50,000, and was considered too small to host a Super Bowl.  This was also the first Super Bowl not to be held in either the Los Angeles, Miami or New Orleans areas. It was also the last Super Bowl, and penultimate game overall (the 1974 Pro Bowl in Kansas City played the next week was the last) to feature goal posts at the front of the end zone (they were moved to the endline, in the back of the end zone, the next season).

This was the Dolphins' third consecutive Super Bowl appearance. They posted a 12–2 record during the regular season, then defeated the Cincinnati Bengals and the Oakland Raiders in the playoffs. The Vikings were making their second Super Bowl appearance after also finishing the regular season with a 12–2 record, and posting postseason victories over the Washington Redskins and the Dallas Cowboys.

Super Bowl VIII was largely dominated by the Dolphins, who scored 24 unanswered points during the first three quarters, including two touchdowns on their first two drives. Minnesota's best chance to threaten Miami occurred with less than a minute left in the first half, but Vikings running back Oscar Reed fumbled the ball away at the Dolphins' 6-yard line, and his team was unable to overcome Miami's lead in the second half. The Dolphins' Larry Csonka became the first running back to be named Super Bowl MVP; both his 145 rushing yards and his 33 carries were Super Bowl records.

Background
The NFL awarded Super Bowl VIII to Houston on March 21, 1972 at the owners' meetings held in Honolulu. For the first time, multiple Super Bowl sites were selected at a single meeting, as hosts for both VII and VIII were named. Houston became the first Super Bowl host city provided with more than one year to prepare for the game, and lead time has grown substantially in succeeding years. Five cities, Los Angeles, Houston, Miami, Dallas, and New Orleans, prepared serious bids, while San Francisco (Stanford Stadium) withdrew from the running a week prior to the vote. After nine deadlocked votes, Bud Adams recommended awarding two consecutive sites. This compromise mirrored an idea brought up in 1971 by representatives from Miami. Los Angeles won on the ninth ballot and was named host of VII, while second place Houston was named the host for VIII.

Miami Dolphins

Although the Dolphins were unable to match their 17–0 perfect season of 1972, many sports writers, fans and Dolphins players themselves felt that the 1973 team was better. While the 1972 team faced no competition that possessed a record better than 8–6 in the regular season, the 1973 team played a much tougher schedule that included games against the Oakland Raiders, Pittsburgh Steelers and Dallas Cowboys (all playoff teams), plus two games against a resurgent Buffalo Bills squad that featured 2,000-yard rusher O. J. Simpson.  Despite this, the Dolphins finished the 1973 season giving up fewer points (150) than in 1972, and recorded a 12–2 record, including an opening-game victory over the San Francisco 49ers that tied an NFL record with 18 consecutive wins. The Dolphins' winning streak ended in Week 2 with a 12–7 loss to the Raiders in Berkeley, California.

Just like the two previous seasons, Miami's offense relied primarily on its rushing attack. Fullback Larry Csonka recorded his third consecutive 1,000-rushing-yard season (1,003 yards), while running back Mercury Morris rushed for 954 yards and scored 10 touchdowns. Running back Jim Kiick was also a key contributor, rushing for 257 yards and catching 27 passes for 208 yards. Quarterback Bob Griese, the AFC's second-leading passer, completed only 116 passes for 1,422 yards, but threw more than twice as many touchdown passes (17) as interceptions (8), and earned an 84.3 passer rating. He became the first quarterback to start three Super Bowls and is joined by Jim Kelly and Tom Brady as the only quarterbacks to start at least three consecutive Super Bowls. Wide receiver Paul Warfield remained the main deep threat on the team, catching 29 passes for 514 yards and 11 touchdowns.  Marlin Briscoe added 30 receptions for 447 yards and 2 scores. The offensive line was strong, once again led by center Jim Langer and right guard Larry Little. Griese, Csonka, Warfield, Langer, Nick Buoniconti and Little would all eventually be elected to the Pro Football Hall of Fame. Bobby Beathard was also elected to the Pro Football Hall of Fame.

Miami's "No Name Defense" continued to dominate their opponents. Future Hall of Fame linebacker Nick Buoniconti recovered three fumbles and returned one for a touchdown. Safety Dick Anderson led the team with eight interceptions, which he returned for 163 yards and two touchdowns on route to winning NFL Defensive Player of the Year. And safety Jake Scott, the previous season's Super Bowl MVP, had four interceptions and 71 return yards. The Dolphins were still using their "53" defense devised at the beginning of the 1971 season, in which Bob Matheson (#53) would be brought in as a fourth linebacker in a 3–4 defense, with Manny Fernandez at nose tackle. Matheson could either rush the passer or drop back into coverage.

Minnesota Vikings

The Vikings also finished the regular season with a 12–2 record, winning their first nine games before a 20-14 loss on Monday Night Football to the Atlanta Falcons. The Vikings' other loss was a 27-0 shutout in Week 12 to the eventual AFC Central Division Champion Cincinnati Bengals, whom the Dolphins defeated in the AFC divisional playoffs.

Minnesota's offense was led by 13-year veteran quarterback Fran Tarkenton. During the regular season, Tarkenton completed 61.7 percent of his passes for 2,113 yards, 15 touchdowns and just seven interceptions. He also rushed for 202 yards and another touchdown. The team's primary deep threat was Pro Bowl wide receiver John Gilliam, who caught 42 passes for 907 yards, an average of 21.6 yards per catch, and scored eight touchdowns. Tight end Stu Voigt was also a key element of the passing game, with 23 receptions for 318 yards and two touchdowns.

The Vikings' main rushing weapon was NFL Rookie of the Year running back Chuck Foreman, who rushed for 801 yards, caught 37 passes for 362 yards and scored six touchdowns. The Vikings had four other significant running backs – Dave Osborn, Bill Brown, Oscar Reed and future actor Ed Marinaro – who combined for 1,469 rushing/receiving yards and 11 touchdowns. The Vikings' offensive line was also very talented, led by right tackle Ron Yary and six-time Pro Bowl center Mick Tingelhoff.

The Minnesota defense ranked second in the league in fewest points allowed (168) and was again anchored by a defensive line nicknamed the "Purple People Eaters", consisting of defensive tackles Gary Larsen and Alan Page, and defensive ends Jim Marshall and Carl Eller. Behind them, Pro Bowl linebacker Jeff Siemon had 2 interceptions and 2 fumble recoveries.  Cornerback Bobby Bryant (seven interceptions, 105 return yards, one touchdown) and safety Paul Krause (four interceptions) led the defensive secondary.

Playoffs

The Vikings earned their second appearance in the Super Bowl after defeating the wild card Washington Redskins, 27–20, and the NFC East champion Dallas Cowboys, 27–10, in the playoffs. Meanwhile, the Dolphins defeated the AFC Central champion Cincinnati Bengals 34–16 in the divisional round, and the AFC West Champion Oakland Raiders, 27–10 for the AFC Championship. The Dolphins were the first team to appear in three consecutive Super Bowls.  Just as in the regular season, Miami relied primarily on their run game in the playoffs, racking up 241 rushing yards against Cincinnati and 266 vs the Raiders.  The ground game was particularly crucial against Oakland, as it enabled them to win despite completing just 3 of 6 passes for 34 yards in the game.

Super Bowl notes
This was the first Super Bowl in which a former AFL franchise was the favorite. The 1970 AFC champion Baltimore Colts had been the favorite in Super Bowl V, but they were an original NFL franchise prior the 1970 merger.

This was also the first Super Bowl played in a stadium that was not the current home to an NFL or AFL team, as no team had called Rice Stadium home since the Houston Oilers moved into the Astrodome in 1968.  At that time, the Astrodome seated just over 50,000 for football, and was considered too small to host the Super Bowl.  It was also the first Super Bowl game played on the then-popular AstroTurf artificial playing surface, not surprising since Houston's Astrodome was the first facility to install AstroTurf in 1966. (Super Bowl V and Super Bowl VI, the first two Super Bowls played on artificial turf were played the competing  Poly-Turf brand.)

The Vikings complained about their practice facilities at Houston ISD's Delmar Stadium, a 20-minute bus ride from their hotel. They said the locker room was cramped, uncarpeted, had no lockers and that most of the shower heads did not work. The practice field had no blocking sleds. "I don't think our players have seen anything like this since junior high school", said Vikings head coach Bud Grant. The Dolphins, meanwhile, trained at the Oilers' facility, since they were an AFC team like Miami.

Having already become the first NFC Central team to even reach the NFC Championship Game, the Vikings became the first non-East Division team from either conference to play in a post-merger Super Bowl.

There were reports of dissension among the Dolphins arising from owner Joe Robbie's decision to allow married players to bring their wives at the club's expense. The single players were reportedly angry that they could not bring their girlfriends, mothers or sisters.

Vikings defensive tackle Alan Page and Dolphins left guard Bob Kuechenberg were former teammates at the University of Notre Dame. Kuechenberg, who would be blocking Page in the game, had sustained a broken arm in a game against the Colts and wore a cast while playing in the Super Bowl. Paul Warfield entered the game with a well-publicized hamstring injury to his left leg.

On television before the game, New York Jets quarterback Joe Namath said, "If Miami gets the kickoff and scores on the opening drive, the game is over.". Indeed, the Dolphins became the first team to score a touchdown after receiving the game's opening kickoff.

The Dolphins, who were designated as the home team, were obligated by a now-defunct policy to wear their aqua jerseys despite having normally worn white jerseys for home games (though Miami wore aqua for its final two regular-season home games vs. the Pittsburgh Steelers and Detroit Lions). Also, the Dolphins wore two slightly different helmet decals; some had the decal that the team had previously used in the 1967 season (Bob Griese's rookie year) and would permanently adopt in 1974 (mostly linemen; with the mascot dolphin leaping through the sun), while others had the decal used in 1966 and again from 1968-1973 (with the mascot dolphin halfway through the sun).

Famed "Gonzo" writer Hunter S. Thompson covered the game for Rolling Stone magazine, and his exploits in Houston are legendary.

This was the only Super Bowl in which the game ball had stripes. Until the late 1970s, the NFL permitted striped footballs for night games, indoor games and other special situations.

Head linesman Leo Miles was the first African-American to officiate in a Super Bowl.

Broadcasting
The game was televised in the United States by CBS with play-by-play announcer Ray Scott and color commentators Pat Summerall and Bart Starr. This was Scott's final telecast for CBS. Midway through the following season Summerall would take Scott's place as the network's lead play-by-play announcer, holding that position through 1993, when CBS lost rights to the NFC television package to Fox.

This is the earliest surviving Super Bowl where the complete original broadcast exists on videotape. Earlier Super Bowls (such as III, V, VI, and VII) had most of the action preserved on videotape but had a portion of the game missing. All Super Bowls from here on out would be preserved in their entirety.

Entertainment
The Longhorn Band from the University of Texas at Austin performed during the pregame festivities. Later, country music singer Charley Pride sang "America the Beautiful" and the national anthem. This game marked the first time that "America the Beautiful" was performed before a Super Bowl game.

The halftime show also featured the Longhorn Band, along with Judy Mallett, Miss Texas 1973, playing the fiddle, in a tribute to American music titled "A Musical America".

The pre-game party was held on the floor of the Astrodome the night before the game.  It was attended by the players, the coaches, media, and celebrities.  Entertainment was provided by The La France Sisters and Charley Pride.

Game summary
The Dolphins' game plan on offense was to use misdirection, negative-influence traps, and cross-blocking to exploit the Minnesota defense's excellent pursuit. (The Kansas City Chiefs had used similar tactics against the same Vikings defensive line in Super Bowl IV). Wrote Jim Langer, "All this was successful right away. We kept ripping huge holes into their defense and Csonka kept picking up good yardage, especially to the right. We'd hear Alan [Page] cussing because those negative-influence plays were just driving him nuts. He didn't know what the hell to do." On defense, the Dolphins' goal was to neutralize Chuck Foreman by using cat-quick Manny Fernandez at nose tackle and to make passing difficult for Tarkenton by knocking down his receivers and double-teaming John Gilliam. They were also depending on defensive ends Bill Stanfill and Vern Den Herder to contain Tarkenton's scrambling. Coach Don Shula wrote, "In the case of Tarkenton we wanted to hem him in. In the case of Page, Eller and company, we wanted to try to turn their aggressiveness to our advantage. We decided to emphasize negative influence by misdirection and cross blocking, trying to make the Vikings Front Four commit to the influence of the play and then actually running it elsewhere. The Vikings responded as we anticipated. Then later in the game we found that the Vikings started hesitating, reducing their charge. When they did that, we beat them with straight blocking."

First quarter
As they had the two previous Super Bowls, the Dolphins won the coin toss and elected to receive. The Dolphins dominated the Vikings right from the beginning, scoring touchdowns on two 10-play drives in the first quarter. Said Jim Langer, "It was obvious from the beginning that our offense could overpower their defense." The two drives were very similar, both containing 8 rushes, 2 passes (both of which were complete), one third-down conversion, and four first downs picked up, while Miami did not get penalized. First, Dolphins defensive back Jake Scott gave his team good field position by returning the opening kickoff 31 yards to the Miami 38-yard line. Then Mercury Morris ran right for four yards, Larry Csonka crashed through the middle for two, and quarterback Bob Griese completed a 13-yard pass to tight end Jim Mandich to advance the ball to the Vikings 43-yard line. Csonka then ran on second down for 16 yards, then Griese completed a six-yard pass to receiver Marlin Briscoe to the 21-yard line. Three more running plays, two by Csonka and one by Morris moved the ball to the Vikings 5-yard line. Csonka then finished the drive with a five-yard touchdown run.

Then after Minnesota's offense went three downs and out, Mike Eischeid's punt went only 34 yards. Scott fumbled the return but recoved the ball, giving Miami better field position than the opening drive. The Dolphins then went 56 yards in 10 plays (aided with three runs by Csonka for eight, 12, and eight yards, and Griese's 13-yard pass to Briscoe) to score on running back Jim Kiick's one-yard run (his only touchdown of the season) to give them a 14–0 lead.

By the time the first quarter ended, Miami had run 20 plays for 118 yards and eight first downs, and scored touchdowns on their first two possessions, with Csonka carrying eight times for 64 yards and Griese completing all four of his passes for 40 yards. Meanwhile, the Miami defense held the Minnesota offense to only 25 yards, six plays from scrimmage, and one first down. The Vikings advanced only as far as their own 27-yard line.  The Dolphins set the record which still stands for the largest Super Bowl lead (14 points) at the end of the first quarter.  It has since been tied by the Oakland Raiders against the Philadelphia Eagles in Super Bowl XV (led 14-0) and the Green Bay Packers against the Pittsburgh Steelers in Super Bowl XLV (led 14-0).

Second quarter
The situation never got much better for the Vikings the rest of the game. After each team traded punts early in the second period, Miami mounted a seven-play drive starting from their own 35-yard line, culminating in a 28-yard field goal from kicker Garo Yepremian to make the score 17–0 midway through the second quarter. On the first play of the drive, Minnesota was penalized 15 yards for unsportsmanlike conduct on linebacker Wally Hilgenberg.  On the previous series, Hilgenberg had thrown an elbow through Csonka's facemask, cutting Csonka above the eye, but had not been penalized.  Later in the drive, Mercury Morris ran for 10 yards on a 3rd down play from the Minnesota 40-yard line to allow Miami to get into field goal range.

The Vikings then had their best opportunity to score in the first half on their ensuing drive. Starting at their own 20-yard line, Minnesota marched to the Miami 15-yard line in nine plays, aided by Fran Tarkenton's completions of 17 and 14 yards to tight end Stu Voigt and wide receiver John Gilliam's 30-yard reception. Tarkenton's eight-yard run on first down then advanced the ball to the 7-yard line. But on the next two plays, Vikings running back Oscar Reed gained only one yard on two rushes, bringing up a fourth-down-and-one with less than a minute left in the half. Instead of kicking a field goal, Minnesota attempted to convert the fourth down with another running play by Reed. However, Reed lost the ball while being tackled by linebacker Nick Buoniconti, and Scott recovered the fumble. About the decision to run with Reed on three straight plays, Grant defended the decision since the Vikes twice had converted in the NFC title game against Dallas. "If it's less than a yard, we go for it", he said. "We feel we have the plays to make it." The Dolphins, however, made the stop where the Cowboys had not.

Jim Langer wrote that at halftime, "We definitely knew that this game was over."

Third quarter
Gilliam returned the second half kickoff 65 yards, but a clipping penalty on the play moved the ball all the way back to the Minnesota 11-yard line. Two plays later, Tarkenton was sacked for a six-yard loss by defensive tackle Manny Fernandez on third down, forcing Minnesota to punt from their own 7-yard line. Scott then returned the punt 12 yards to the Minnesota 43-yard line.

Miami then marched 43 yards in eight plays to score on Csonka's two-yard touchdown run through Hilgenberg to increase their lead to 24–0 with almost nine minutes left in the third quarter. The key play was Griese's third-and-five, 27-yard pass to wide receiver Paul Warfield to the Minnesota 11-yard line. It was Griese's last pass of the game, his only pass of the second half and just the seventh overall, and only Warfield's second, and last, catch of the game. (Because of his hamstring injury, Warfield had earlier been limping through primarily decoy routes.) The Vikings might have had the drive held to a field goal attempt when Morris lost 8 yards on a third-and-4 play from the Minnesota 5, but Hilgenberg was called for holding, giving Miami an automatic first down at the 8. From there, Csonka carried twice to a score. On the scoring play, Griese forgot the snap count at the line of scrimmage. He asked Csonka, who said "two." Kiick said, "No, it's one." Griese chose to believe Csonka, which was a mistake; it was "one." Griese bobbled the ball slightly, but still managed to get it to Csonka.

After an exchange of punts, Minnesota got the ball back at their 43-yard line after Larry Seiple's kick went just 24 yards.

Fourth quarter
The Vikings then mounted a 10-play, 57-yard drive, with Tarkenton completing 5 passes for 43 yards, including a 15-yarder to Voigt on 3rd-and-8, and taking the ball into the end zone himself six plays into the 4th quarter on a 4-yard touchdown run. This was the first rushing touchdown by a quarterback in Super Bowl history.

Minnesota recovered the ensuing onside kick, but an offsides penalty on the Vikings nullified the play, and they subsequently kicked deep. Miami went three-and-out, but Seiple boomed a 57-yard punt and Minnesota got the ball back at its own 3-yard line. Eight plays later, along with the only penalty charged to Miami in the game (four yards for pass interference), the Vikings reached the Miami 32-yard line. Tarkenton got there with a 27-yard completion to Ed Marinaro. But after two incomplete passes, his pass intended for wide receiver Jim Lash was intercepted by Dolphins cornerback Curtis Johnson at the goal line. Miami got the ball back at their 10-yard line with 6:24 left in the game, and Csonka and Kiick were the ball carriers on all 12 remaining plays. The Dolphins picked up 2 first downs by rush and 2 by penalty on Minnesota in running out the clock. With less than four minutes to play, a frustrated Alan Page was called for a personal foul for a late hit on Griese, and then two plays later both Page and Kuechenberg were given offsetting personal fouls after getting in a scuffle with each other.

Wrote Jim Langer, "We just hit the Vikings defense so hard and so fast that they didn't know what hit them. Alan Page later said he knew we would dominate them after only the first couple of plays."

Griese finished the game with just six out of seven pass completions for 73 yards. Miami's seven pass attempts were the fewest ever thrown by a team in the Super Bowl. The Dolphins rushed for 196 yards, did not have any turnovers, and were not penalized in the first 52 minutes. Tarkenton set what was then a Super Bowl record for completions, 18 out of 28 for 182 yards, with one interception, and rushed for 17 yards and a touchdown. Reed was the leading rusher for the Vikings, but with just 32 yards. Tight end Stu Voigt was the top receiver of the game with three catches for 46 yards. The Vikings' lethargic performance was very similar to their performance in their loss to the Kansas City Chiefs in Super Bowl IV.

Box score

Final statistics
Sources:  NFL.com Super Bowl VIII, Super Bowl VIII Play Finder Mia, Super Bowl VIII Play Finder Min

Statistical comparison

Individual statistics

1Completions/attempts
2Carries
3Long gain
4Receptions
5Times targeted

Records set
The following records were set or tied in Super Bowl VIII, according to the official NFL.com boxscore and the ProFootball reference.com game summary. Some records have to meet NFL minimum number of attempts to be recognized. The minimums are shown (in parenthesis).

 † This category includes rushing, receiving, interception returns, punt returns, kickoff returns, and fumble returns.

Turnovers are defined as the number of times losing the ball on interceptions and fumbles.

Super Bowl postgame news and notes
In the Dolphins' locker room after the game, Csonka was asked about his battered face. Without naming Hilgenberg, he said, "It was a cheap shot, but an honest cheap shot. He came right at me and threw an elbow right through my mask. I could see the game meant something to him."

With their 32–2 record over two years, the still-young Dolphins appeared to have established a dynasty. In 1974, however, their offense was hurt by injuries to Csonka and the offensive line, and the defense was hurt by the departure of defensive coordinator Bill Arnsparger who became the New York Giants head coach. The Dolphins finished 11–3 but lost a dramatic playoff game ("The Sea of Hands") to the Oakland Raiders. In 1975 Csonka, Kiick, and Warfield left to join the World Football League. The Dolphins would not win another playoff game until 1982, and they have not won a Super Bowl since. They would appear in but lose two more, XVII and XIX.

Jim Langer ended his career with the Vikings in 1981, allowing him to play for the franchise closest to his native South Dakota. Langer lost his starting center job in 1980 to Dwight Stephenson, who like Langer is a member of the Hall of Fame.

Starting lineups

Source:

Officials
 Referee: Ben Dreith (#12) first Super Bowl
 Umpire: Ralph Morcroft (#15) second Super Bowl (II)
 Head Linesman: Leo Miles (#35) first Super Bowl
 Line Judge: Jack Fette (#39) second Super Bowl (V)
 Back Judge: Stan Javie (#29) second Super Bowl (II)
 Field Judge: Fritz Graf (#34) second Super Bowl (V)
Alternate Referee: Dick Jorgensen (#60) later was an alternate for Super Bowl XV and worked Super Bowl XXIV on field
Alternate Umpire: Frank Sinkovitz (#20) later worked Super Bowl XV on field
Note: A seven-official system was not used until the 1978 season.

Leo Miles was the first African-American to officiate in a Super Bowl.

References

 Super Bowl official website
 
 
 
 
 https://www.pro-football-reference.com – Large online database of NFL data and statistics
 Super Bowl play-by-plays from USA Today (Last accessed September 28, 2005)

Super Bowl
Miami Dolphins postseason
Minnesota Vikings postseason
1973 National Football League season
1974 in American football
American football in Houston
Sports competitions in Houston
January 1974 sports events in the United States
1970s in Houston
1974 in sports in Texas